June Purvis is an emeritus professor of women's and gender history at the University of Portsmouth.

From 2014-18, Purvis was Chair of the Women’s History Network UK and from 2015-20 Treasurer of the International Federation for Research in Women’s History. She organized at the University of Portsmouth on 31st August–1st September 2018 the Women's History Network Annual conference on the Campaigns for Women’s Suffrage: National and International Perspectives. She edits the journal Women's History Review.

Selected publications
Purvis, June (2008) Women's History: Britain, 1850-1945: An Introduction. Routledge, London and New York. .
Purvis, June (2002) Emmeline Pankhurst: a biography, Routledge, London and New York.   (hardback).  (paperback).
Purvis, June (1991) A history of women’s education in England, Open University Press, Milton Keynes and Philadelphia. .  Translated into Japanese 1997 Minerva Press
Purvis, June (1989) Hard lessons: the lives and education of working-class women in nineteenth-century England, Polity Press, Cambridge.  .

References

External links 
"History Today" articles by June Purvis
"We owe them the vote", theguardian.com. Accessed 12 November 2022. 

Living people
Academics of the University of Portsmouth
Alumni of the Open University
Year of birth missing (living people)